Lake Wappapello State Park is a public recreation area consisting of  bordering Lake Wappapello in Wayne County, Missouri. The state park features two campgrounds, trails for hikers, bikers, backpackers, and equestrians, and swimming, fishing, and boating on the lake.

History
Lake Wappapello was created when, beginning in 1938, the U.S. Army Corps of Engineers dammed the St. Francis River for flood control purposes. The state began leasing land bordering the lake for use as a state park in 1956.

References

External links
Lake Wappapello State Park Missouri Department of Natural Resources
Lake Wappapello State Park Map Missouri Department of Natural Resources

State parks of Missouri
Protected areas of Wayne County, Missouri
Protected areas established in 1956